Adult child may refer to:
 An offspring that has reached the age of majority
 Vulnerable adult, an adult that lacks basic life skills
 Adult/Child, an unreleased album by the Beach Boys
 Adult Children, a 1961 Soviet comedy film
 Kidult, an gender neutral term referring an adult with childish interests

See also 
 Cognitive deficit
 Learning disability
 Adult Children of Alcoholics
 Manchild (disambiguation)
 Kidult (disambiguation)